Neelum Kinaray, is a 2015 Pakistani television drama series that aired on Hum TV. It was produced by Mehroz Karim and Momina Duraid under MD Productions, directed by Adnan Wai Qureshi and written by Amna Mufti. It starred Ushna Shah, Gohar Mumtaz, Sumbul Iqbal, and Affan Waheed.

Plot 

Sakina is portrayed as an orphan girl raised by her uncle Aslam Butt aunt after the death of her mother as her father left. She is disliked by her aunt Appu Ji, but her cousin Ijaz helps her and whom she loves. Despite Appu Ji's opposition, Aslam fixes Ijaz's marriage with Sakina. Ijaz goes abroad for a better job and admits Sakina to a college. Ijaz's cousin Laraib, who wanted to marry Ijaz, takes full advantage of this opportunity and casts doubt on Ijaz's heart against Sakina when Ijaz's friend Yaseen comes to their house.

Cast 

 Ushna Shah as Sakina: Ijaz's cousin and eventual wife
 Gohar Mumtaz as Ijaz: Sakina's husband
 Sumbal Iqbal as Laraib: Ijaz's cousin
 Affan Waheed as Yaseen: Ijaz's friend
 Samina Peerzada as Zainab "Appu Ji": Ijaz's mother
 Naeem Tahir as Aslam Butt: Ijaz's father
 Nargis Rasheed as Safia: Laraib's mother
 Khalid Butt as Laraib's father: Laraib's father
 Ayub Khoso as Riaz: a professor Sakina stayed with
 Kashif Mehmood as Jabbar: Prof. Riaz's servant
 Tanveer Abbas

Production 
The production location of the series was Neelum Valley, Kashmir. The script was written by 2014 Lux Style Award winner, Amna Mufti.

References

External links
Official website

Pakistani drama television series
2017 Pakistani television series debuts
2017 Pakistani television series endings
Urdu-language television shows
Hum TV original programming